Zeytindağ is a town in İzmir Province, Turkey.

Geography 

Zeytindağ (literally "olive-mountain") is a town in Bergama district of İzmir Province, Turkey. The population of the town is 3192 as of 2011.

History

Zeytindağ history dates back to ancient ages. These ruins are thought to be of the ancient port city of Elaea. This city was founded before the Ionians settled in Aegean coasts. But it flourished during the kingdom of Pergamon. After the sea shore receded because of the gradual accumulation of alluvial deposit, Elaea lost its former importance.

According to town page  the former name of the town in the Medieval ages was Kilisköy or Kiliseköy referring to calcareous soil around the town (Kilis means lime in Ottoman Turkish) In 1909, the town was renamed Reşadiye in the name of the new Ottoman sultan Mehmet V, (also called Reşat) and then Zeytindağ referring to Olive production of the town. (The name Elaea seems to mean olive grove and the present name of the town Zeytindağ means olive mountain.) 
In 1953, the village was declared a seat of township.

References

Populated places in İzmir Province
Towns in Turkey
Bergama District